Wireless Toronto is a volunteer not-for-profit community wireless network in Toronto. Wireless Toronto began in 2005 with the goal of setting up no-cost public wireless Internet access around the Greater Toronto Area and exploring ways to use Wi-Fi technology to strengthen local community and culture.  At its peak, Wireless Toronto hotspots served over 1000 connections per day at 38 individual locations.

Wireless Toronto hotspots are created using Linksys WRT54G or Motorola WR850G wireless routers running OpenWrt and WifiDog.

Other free wireless services in the GTA
 The Toronto Public Library (TPL) offers free public wireless access in all of its 99 branches.
 The Markham Public Libraries (MPL) offers free public wireless access in the Angus Glen Library, the Markham Village Library, the Thornhill Community Library, and the Unionville Library
 Viva offers free wireless access on its Rapid Transit Vehicles
 TOwifi offers a free Wi-Fi hotspot map
 The TTC offers free, ad supported wireless service at many of its stations

See also
 Municipal wireless network
List of wireless community networks by region

References

External links
Wireless Toronto Site
Wireless Toronto Blog
Wireless Toronto Locations Map
Toronto Public Library Free Wireless Internet Access Service

Toronto
Organizations based in Toronto